Ayyub Huseynov was an Azerbaijani artist, pedagogue, Honored Art Worker of the USSR, member of the Union of Artists of Azerbaijan.

Biography 
Ayyub Huseynov was born in Khok in Norashen district (now Kangarli) in the Russian Empire. His first education was received in 1930 in the Azerbaijan Painting Technique in Baku and later in 1935 at the Tbilisi State Academy of Arts.
Education at the Academy of Art in Tbilisi was accompanied by difficulties and successes in mastering artistic skills and deep knowledge. During his studies in Tbilisi, he has learned from the prominent Georgian artists and has mastered the skills of perfection in painting. After completing higher education, he returned to Nakhchivan.

During his life in Nakhchivan, he produced artworks for the young artists, who created works of various genres and performances staged at the local theater. Here he has prepared artistic designs and costume sketches for many performances with well-known painter Shamil Gaziyev. In the theater of Nakhchivan, he created costume sketches and paintings for plays like Abdurrahim bey Hagverdiyev's "Peri-cadu", "Farhad and Shirin" of Samad Vurgun, "Vatan" by Abdulla Shaig, "Polad" by Nagi Nagiyev, "Gunash doğur" by Abulfaz Abbasguliyev. A young artist, who was convinced that the artistic environment of Baku will create more opportunities for his future career, moved from Nakhchivan to the capital in 1948. By that, he became a teacher where he studied for the first time. Along with teaching at the Azerbaijan State Art School named after Azim Azimzade, he was also engaged in independent creativity. Ayyub Huseynov, who has been teaching here since 1948, worked as a school director in 1956-1965. During this period, a successful outcome of the school teaching process was that most of our artists and sculptors, representing Azerbaijan's deserving art in the world, have been trained in the years when he was the director. He played an important role in the history of "Azimzadeh School", which was the prestigious educational institution in the former USSR.
While it is difficult to combine pedagogical activity with creativity, Ayyub Huseynov managed to succeed. An artist who has been participating in exhibitions in Baku and the former USSR, as well as outside the country borders, has introduced himself as a master artist in all genres of his own art.

References 

Soviet painters
Azerbaijani portrait painters
20th-century Azerbaijani painters
Tbilisi State Academy of Arts alumni
People from Nakhchivan
1916 births
1998 deaths